Aleksandar Stevanović (born 16 February 1992) is a German former professional footballer who played as an attacking midfielder.

Club career

Schalke 04
Started out his senior career in the Schalke 04 U-19 squad. In his first year in the Under 19 Bundesliga West, he made 19 appearances and scored eleven goals.

Werder Bremen
On 23 June 2011, Stevanović joined Werder Bremen on a free transfer. In summer 2014 his expiring contract was not extended.

Hansa Rostock
After being a free agent for almost three months, Stevanović signed for 3. Liga club Hansa Rostock in late September 2014. He received a contract for two years until 2016.

Stevanović retired from playing in 2019 at the age of 27, ending an injury-ravaged career during which he sustained three cruciate ligament tears.

Personal life
He is a younger brother of fellow professional footballer Predrag Stevanović.

Career statistics

Notes

1992 births
Living people
German people of Serbian descent
Footballers from Essen
German footballers
Serbian footballers
Association football midfielders
SV Werder Bremen players
SV Werder Bremen II players
FC Hansa Rostock players
SV Elversberg players
3. Liga players
Bundesliga players
Regionalliga players